Seidlitzia a genus of flowering plants belonging to the family Amaranthaceae. It is also in the Salsoloideae subfamily.

Its native range is from Egypt, Central Asia (within Afghanistan, Iran, Iraq, Lebanon, Palestine, Sinai, Syria, Tadzhikistan, Transcaucasus, Turkey, Turkmenistan and Uzbekistan,) to Western Himalayas and Pakistan, India and the Arabian Peninsula (within the Gulf States, Kuwait, Oman, Saudi Arabia and Socotra).

The genus name of Seidlitzia is in honour of Nikolai Karl Samuel von Seidlitz (1831–1907), a Baltic German botanist and statistician. 
It was first described and published in Fl. Orient. Vol.4 on page 950 in 1879.

Known species
Accepted species by Kew include:

References

Amaranthaceae genera
Plants described in 1879
Flora of Egypt
Flora of the Transcaucasus
Flora of Western Asia
Flora of the Arabian Peninsula
Flora of Pakistan
Flora of West Himalaya
Flora of India (region)
Amaranthaceae